José María Menéndez Monroig (June 22, 1917 – April 4, 2003) was a member of the Puerto Rico Senate serving from 1968 till 1976.  After the 1972 Puerto Rican elections Carlos Romero Barcelo suggested that he be selected Minority Leader in the Senate instead of Justo Méndez who had occupied that position in the past four years.  He was one of the founders of Estadistas Unidos.  He was a member of Phi Sigma Alpha fraternity.

He was known to mentor future leaders of the New Progressive Party. He was also secretary of the party. While serving as Minority Leader of the Senate, his chief of staff was Rafael Rodríguez Aguayo, who went on to serve as Secretary General of the New Progressive Party and as an aide to governors Carlos Romero Barceló, Pedro Rosselló and Luis Fortuño.  His administrative assistant, Carmencita Colón De Armas, went on to serve three governors, Romero, Pedro Rosselló and Ricardo Rosselló in high level positions within the Governor's Office, and a summer intern, Kenneth McClintock, succeeded him a quarter century later as Senate Minority Leader.

He served for six years in the United States Army, and was buried with military honors in the Puerto Rico National Cemetery.

References

External links

Members of the Senate of Puerto Rico
New Progressive Party (Puerto Rico) politicians
Puerto Rican military officers
1917 births
2003 deaths
20th-century American politicians